The 1980 NHK Trophy was held at the Makomanai Ice Arena in Sapporo. Medals were awarded in the disciplines of men's singles, ladies' singles, pair skating, and ice dancing.

Results

Men

Ladies

Pairs

Ice dancing

External links

 1980 NHK Trophy

Nhk Trophy, 1980
NHK Trophy